A watermark is a recognizable image or pattern in paper used to determine authenticity.

Watermark or watermarking may also refer to:

Technology
 Digital watermarking, a technique to embed data in digital audio, images or video
 Audio watermark, techniques for embedding hidden information into audio signals
 Watermark (data file), a method for ensuring data integrity which combines aspects of data hashing and digital watermarking
 Watermark (data synchronization), directory synchronization related programming terminology
 Watermarking attack, an attack on disk encryption methods

Films
 Watermark (film), a 2013 documentary film directed by Jennifer Baichwal and Edward Burtynsky
 Watermarks (film), a 2004 documentary film about the Viennese Hakoah swim team

Music
 Watermark (Art Garfunkel album), a 1977 album by Art Garfunkel
 Watermark (Enya album), a 1988 album by Enya
 Watermark (band), the CCM singing duo Nathan and Christy Nockels
 "Watermark", a song by Mae Moore from her 1995 album Dragonfly
 "Watermark", a song by The Weakerthans from their 2000 album Left and Leaving

Organizations
 Watermark Inc., a radio syndication company
 Shenhua Watermark coal mine

Other uses
 Watermark, a 1992 book by Joseph Brodsky

See also
 Watermark, superimposed identifying digital on-screen graphic in video production
 High water mark (disambiguation)